The Seventh Veil is a 1945 British melodrama film directed by Compton Bennett and starring James Mason and Ann Todd. It was made by Ortus Films (a company established by producer Sydney Box) and released through General Film Distributors in the UK and Universal Pictures in the United States. The screenplay concerns Francesca (Todd), a brilliant concert pianist who attempts suicide while she is being treated for a disabling delusional disorder centered on her hands that makes it impossible for her to play. A psychiatrist uses hypnosis to uncover the source of her crippling fear and to reveal, one by one, the relationships that have enriched and troubled her life. When the last “veil” is removed, her mind is clear. She regains the ability to play and knows whom she loves best. The film's title comes from the metaphor, attributed to the fictional psychiatrist, that while Salome removed all her veils willingly, human beings fiercely protect the seventh and last veil that hides their deepest secrets, and will only reveal themselves completely under narcosis.

Plot
Francesca Cunningham is a brilliant concert pianist suffering from a delusion that she has lost the use of her hands. Despairing, she slips out of the nursing home where she is staying and jumps into the river. She survives, but is unresponsive. Dr. Larsen, a psychiatrist specializing in hypnosis, leads Francesca to describe events in her life that appear as flashbacks.

When she is 14, music is “everything”. A teacher canes Francesca's hands, ruining her chances of winning a piano scholarship. Her father's sudden death puts her in the care of his second cousin, Nicholas, a misogynistic bachelor who walks with a cane. Nicholas ignores her until a school report reveals that she is a gifted pianist. Nicholas does not play well, but he is a brilliant and inspiring teacher. They work for hours every day and he arranges for her to be a pupil at the Royal College of Music, but he violently rejects any demonstration of gratitude.

At the college, Francesca is blissful until Nicholas “takes away all her happiness.”  Peter, a brash American musician studying in London, charms her and opens a world to her, including a waltz that Nicholas scorns as “suburban shop girl trash”. She proposes to him. Nicholas hears the news and calmly orders her to pack a bag because they are leaving for Paris in the morning to continue her studies. She defies him until he reminds her that she is 17. Until she is 21 he has complete control over her. Francesca tells Larsen that for the next seven years Nicholas never left her out of his sight as they prepared for her future as the ideal concert pianist. Over and over again, he reminds her to take care of her precious hands.

Francesca's debut concert in Venice is a great success, but an old school friend tactlessly reminds her of the failed music exam, and the stress is so great that she faints on stage. “I could almost feel my fingers swelling…” she tells Larsen.

Eventually, Francesca performs at the Royal Albert Hall. The audience roars. She brushes past Nicholas to go out to find Peter. She finds him by chance, on a poster outside the elegant nightclub where he leads the band. The band plays their waltz, they dance—and Francesca refuses to tell the doctor what happened next.

Instead, she tells him about Maxwell Leyden, an artist whom Nicholas commissions to do her portrait. They soon fall in love and agree to go to live in Max's villa in Italy. Nicholas is outraged. She tells him she is grateful for many things and will never forgive him for others. She plays the second movement (adagio cantabile) of the Piano Sonata Pathétique by Beethoven, louder and louder, drowning out Nicholas' long rant to the effect that she belongs to him. Furious, he slams his cane down on the keyboard, just missing her hands. She screams and runs to Max who whisks her away in the car. There is an accident and she wakes in the nursing home with bandages on her very slightly burned hands,  irrationally convinced she will never play again. The story has come full circle.

While she is still under hypnosis, Larsen gets her to play the adagio, but the memory of Nicholas intrudes, and she faints.

Max removes her from the nursing home and refuses to let Larsen continue treatment. Larsen goes to Nicholas and plays a recording of the adagio. Nicholas breaks the record. Larsen thanks him for revealing what Francesca means to him. Nicholas goes to Max's house and convinces Francesca that Larsen can help her. Meanwhile, Larsen sees Peter, who tells him that the night Francesca returned, he told her he was married. However, he is now divorced. Larsen brings Peter to Nicholas's home, where Max also waits, and they go upstairs, We hear Peter's waltz, and then the adagio. Larsen descends while Francesca plays. He warns the three men that she is a new Francesca, no longer afraid, who will want to be with the one she loves, trusts, has been happiest with, cannot live without. Nicholas withdraws to another room. Smiling, Francesca runs downstairs, through the door and into his arms.

Cast

Production
Sydney and Muriel Box were commissioned to film a documentary about shell-shocked soldiers being treated with the help of hypnosis. Muriel then began to think there was dramatic potential in the premise of hypnotherapy. The couple wrote the screenplay, and Sydney went on to produce the movie.

According to Mason, the original script concluded with Francesca choosing Peter as the one she loves. Mason and wife Pamela Kellino believed such an ending to be "wrong" and "rather dull."

The film score was written by Benjamin Frankel (credited as Ben Frankel) with original piano works by Chopin, Mozart, and Beethoven, as well as parts of the Grieg and Rachmaninoff 2nd piano concertos.

Eileen Joyce, whose name does not appear in the credits, was the pianist who substituted for Todd on the soundtrack. She also made a short film for Todd to practise to, and even coached Todd personally in her arm movements. It is Joyce's hands that are seen in all the close-ups.

Reception

Filmed on a relatively low budget of under £100,000, the film was the biggest British box-office success of its year. According to Kinematograph Weekly the "biggest winners" at the box office in 1945 Britain were The Seventh Veil, with Madonna of the Seven Moons, Arsenic and Old Lace and Meet Me in St Louis among the runner-ups. By February 1948, its box-office receipts were over £2 million worldwide.

In 2004, the British Film Institute compiled a list of the 100 biggest UK cinematic hits of all time based on audience figures, as opposed to gross takings. The Seventh Veil placed 10th in this list with an estimated attendance of 17.9 million people.

The film was entered into the 1946 Cannes Film Festival. It won an Academy Award for Best Original Screenplay (for Sydney and Muriel Box) that same year.

Pauline Kael called The Seventh Veil "a rich, portentous mixture of Beethoven, Chopin, kitsch, and Freud," adding that "[a]ll this nonsense is highly entertaining: maybe, with a few veils stripped away, most of us have a fantasist inside who gobbles up this sadomasochistic sundae, with its culture sauce."

Looking back at the movie and its reception, Todd said, "It was the film that had everything — a bit of Pygmalion, a bit of Trilby, a bit of Cinderella. Apart from all that it's an intriguing psychological drama and was one of the first films to have a hero who was cruel. Most male stars up to then had been honest, kind, upstanding, good-looking men that the female star was supposed to feel safe and secure with for the rest of her life when they finally got together at the end of the film. Not so with our smash hit. The men saw me as a victim and the women thrilled to Mason's power and cruelty, as women have thrilled to this since the world began, however much they deny it..."

Adaptations
On 5 October 1946, This Is Hollywood presented The Seventh Veil. Ray Milland and Ann Todd starred in the adaptation.

The Seventh Veil was also presented by the Lux Radio Theatre on September 15, 1947, starring Joseph Cotten and Ida Lupino; and then on December 13, 1948, now starring Ingrid Bergman and Robert Montgomery.

Another version was broadcast by Philip Morris Playhouse on 3 February 1952. The 30-minute adaptation starred David Niven and University of Oklahoma student Edrita Pokorny.

In 1951, Ann Todd, Leo Genn (playing the Mason role), and Herbert Lom appeared in a stage adaptation of the same title in London.

References

Notes

Bibliography
 The Great British Films, pp 88–90, Jerry Vermilye, 1978, Citadel Press,

External links
 
 
 
 
 
 Review of film at Variety

1945 films
1945 drama films
Films about classical music and musicians
Films directed by Compton Bennett
Films whose writer won the Best Original Screenplay Academy Award
British psychological drama films
Films with screenplays by Sydney Box
Films produced by Sydney Box
Films scored by Benjamin Frankel
Films with screenplays by Muriel Box
Films about hypnosis
1940s psychological drama films
British black-and-white films
British drama films
Melodrama films
1940s English-language films
1940s British films